German submarine U-417 was a Type VIIC U-boat of Nazi Germany's Kriegsmarine during World War II.

She carried out one patrol. She did not sink or damage any ships.

She was sunk by a British aircraft southeast of Iceland on 11 June 1943.

Design
German Type VIIC submarines were preceded by the shorter Type VIIB submarines. U-417 had a displacement of  when at the surface and  while submerged. She had two shafts and two  propellers.

U-417 was fitted with five  torpedo tubes (four fitted at the bow and one at the stern), fourteen torpedoes, one  SK C/35 naval gun, 220 rounds, and two twin  C/30 anti-aircraft guns. The boat had a complement of between forty-four and sixty.

Service history
The submarine was laid down on 16 September 1941 at the Danziger Werft (yard) at Danzig (now Gdansk), as yard number 118, launched on 6 June 1942 and commissioned on the 26th September under the command of Oberleutnant zur See Wolfgang Schreiner.

She served with the 8th U-boat Flotilla from 26 September 1942 and the 6th flotilla from 1 June 1943.

Patrol and loss
U-417 was sunk on 11 June 1943 southeast of Iceland by depth charges from a British B-17 Flying Fortress of No. 206 Squadron RAF.

Forty-six men were lost with U-417; there were no survivors.

Aftermath
U-417s anti-aircraft fire had been accurate. The B-17 ditched; all eight of the crew were forced to share a single dinghy. On 14 June, an American navy PBY Catalina attempted a landing but crashed. Its crew of nine found themselves adrift on two rafts. The B-17 crew were found and rescued by Jack Holmes in a British Catalina of 190 squadron on the same day of their ditching, but the Americans were not found for another five days. Only one man survived, the others died of exposure.

References

Bibliography

External links

German Type VIIC submarines
U-boats commissioned in 1942
U-boats sunk in 1943
U-boats sunk by British aircraft
U-boats sunk by depth charges
1942 ships
Ships built in Danzig
Ships lost with all hands
World War II shipwrecks in the Atlantic Ocean
World War II submarines of Germany
Maritime incidents in June 1943